The Abbey of St. Bertin was a Benedictine monastic abbey in Saint-Omer, France. The buildings are now in ruins, which are open to the public. It was initially dedicated to  but was rededicated to its second abbot, .

He sent the monks Bertin, Momelin, and Ebertram from Sithiu (now St-Omer) to proselytize among the pagans in the region. Its library included the codex of the Leiden Aratea, from which two copies were made. The Annals of St Bertin are an important source of the history of 9th-century France.

Already in the 9th century, the abbey had a priory in Poperinge. A Romanesque church was constructed in the mid-11th century. It included a large 14th-century semi-circular sanctuary with five side-chapels. It served as a model for the church, whose construction was not completed until the beginning of the 16th century.

Bishop Herman of Ramsbury was a monk at the abbey from 1055 to 1058, having abandoned his duties but not his title, which he resumed upon his election as bishop of Sherborne. From 1106, the abbey had the right of appointing the priests at Lissewege and Ruiselede. William Clito was buried here in 1128. The abbey had a 'refuge-house' in the now-demolished Sint-Lodewijkscollege in Bruges.

The abbey ceased to flourish after the 13th century, although it survived until its closure during the French Revolution. In 1830, the commune ordered the demolition of the church, though they spared the tower. The buttress they erected to support it is still visible, although the tower itself collapsed in 1947 owing to damage sustained in the shelling of the town during World War II. St-Omer's town hall was constructed with stone removed from the site in 1834.

References 

Saint Bertin
7th-century establishments in Francia
Saint Bertin
Ruins in Hauts-de-France
Burial sites of the House of Normandy
Burial sites of the Herbertien dynasty
Saint-Omer
Monuments historiques of Pas-de-Calais
1830 disestablishments in France